The Elizabeth-class ships of the line were a class of eight 74-gun third rates, designed for the Royal Navy by Sir Thomas Slade.

Ships

References

Lavery, Brian (2003) The Ship of the Line – Volume 1: The development of the battlefleet 1650–1850. Conway Maritime Press. .

 
Ship of the line classes